Sari Beygluy-e Moin (also Romanized as Sārī Beyglūy-e Moʿīn) is a village in Baranduzchay-ye Shomali Rural District, in the Central District of Urmia County, West Azerbaijan Province, Iran. At the 2006 census, its population was 329, in 79 families.

References 

Populated places in Urmia County